is a railway station in Mihara, Hiroshima, Japan, operated by West Japan Railway Company (JR West).

Lines
Mihara Station is served by the following JR West lines.
 Sanyo Shinkansen
 Sanyo Main Line
 Kure Line

History
The station opened on 10 June 1894.

External links

 JR West station information 

Railway stations in Hiroshima Prefecture
Sanyō Main Line
Sanyō Shinkansen
Railway stations in Japan opened in 1894